Conifer is an unincorporated community in Jefferson County, in the U.S. state of Pennsylvania.

History
Conifer was originally a mining community. A post office called Conifer was established in 1908, and remained in operation until 1930.

References

Unincorporated communities in Jefferson County, Pennsylvania
Unincorporated communities in Pennsylvania